The Bathurst High Campus (abbreviated as BHC or BHS) of Denison College of Secondary Education is a government-funded co-educational comprehensive secondary day school campus, located in Bathurst, in the Central West region of New South Wales, Australia.

Established in 1883 as Bathurst High School, the school amalgamated with Kelso High School in 2007 to form Denison College of Secondary Education. In 2018 Bathurst High Campus enrolled approximately 1,200 students from Year 7 to Year 12, of whom approximately eleven percent identified as Indigenous Australians and six percent were from a language background other than English. The campus is operated by the NSW Department of Education; and the Campus Principal is Ken Barwick.

The campus has several bands and a range of art, visual design, dance and drama classes, and debating teams.

Denison College of Secondary Education
After the August 2005 fire which destroyed Kelso High, Denison College was formed to share curriculum, facilities and staff between schools in order to enhance student choice. Bathurst High has since undergone a name change from Bathurst High School to Bathurst High Campus; and is a campus of Denison College of Secondary Education.

Astley Cup
The Astley Cup is a long-standing sporting competition between Bathurst High, Orange High and Dubbo Senior College. The Astley Cup incorporates rugby league, girls and boys soccer, tennis, hockey, basketball, karate, netball and athletics. The Astley Cup also includes the coveted Mulvey Cup debating competition. Bathurst High has had a long history of victory in this debating competition, successfully taking out the cup this year. The campus mascots for the Astley Competition are Frosty the bear and Malfoy the dragon.

Bathurst High School Song
Comrades all united by a common bond we throng.
Teachers, scholars, athletes lift your heads and join the song.
Through this sunny country let it echo, loud and long.
We are the Bathurst High School.

Hurrah! Hurrah! For we are young and free!
Hurrah! Hurrah! Triumphant we shall be!
Seeking higher things until we gain our victory,
For our beloved High School.

Flaunting to the heavens now our royal blue and gold,
Forth we go adventuring, like doughty knights of old.
Seeking fame and glory, and inheritance untold,
we are the Bathurst High School

Hurrah! Hurrah! For we are young and free!
Hurrah! Hurrah! Triumphant we shall be!
Seeking higher things until we gain our victory,
For our beloved High School.

For our beloved High School.

Notable alumni

 Brian Boothcricket player; represented Australia
 Allan Robert CallaghanRhodes Scholar in 1925
 Nan Hunt, writer
 Rodney Rudecomedian, poet and writer
 Archie Thompsonsoccer player; played with the Socceroos
 Matthew Lobb - Rhodes Scholar in 1994

See also 

 List of government schools in New South Wales
 Education in Australia

References

External links
 
  
 NSW Schools website

Educational institutions established in 1883
Public high schools in New South Wales
Education in Bathurst, New South Wales
1883 establishments in Australia